Ozan Tufan (born 23 March 1995) is a Turkish professional footballer who plays as a midfielder for EFL Championship club Hull City and the Turkey national team. His primary position is holding midfielder but he can also play as both right back and also right winger.

Club career
On 19 August 2021, Tufan left Turkey for the first time in his career when he joined newly promoted Premier League club Watford on a season-long loan deal with the option to buy. On 2 February 2022, the loan was terminated early with Tufan returning to Turkey having only made nine appearances in all competitions. Following his return, Watford's Academy Manager, Omer Riza, talked about Tufan's struggle to adapt to the pace of the Premier League.

On 1 July 2022, Tufan signed for Championship club Hull City for an undisclosed fee. Tufan signed a three-year deal with the club holding the option for a further year. Tufan made his debut on 30 July 2022 in the home match against Bristol City and scored a penalty to level the score.

International career
Tufan played for the Turkey national under-19 team, which won the silver medal at the 2013 Mediterranean Games in Mersin, Turkey. He also represented his country at the 2013 UEFA European Under-19 Championship.

On 25 May 2014, Tufan played his first national match for Turkey against Ireland in Dublin. On 3 September 2014, Tufan scored his first goal, a long range shot against Denmark in a friendly game at 90th minute. Turkey won the game 2–1. In a post-match interview about the game he replied " I had the ball in front of me and right when I was about to kick it, I heard Arda Turan backing me to shoot. I initially had the scare of hitting my shot off-range, on such an important moment; but I kept my composure and hit the ball right after. I want to thank Fatih Terim for giving me this chance, I think I've done the best I could today."

Career statistics

Club

International

Scores and results list Turkey's goal tally first, score column indicates score after each Tufan goal.

References

External links

 
 
 
 

1995 births
Living people
People from Orhaneli
Turkish footballers
Turkey youth international footballers
Turkey international footballers
Association football defenders
Bursaspor footballers
Fenerbahçe S.K. footballers
Alanyaspor footballers
Watford F.C. players
Hull City A.F.C. players
Süper Lig players
Premier League players
English Football League players
UEFA Euro 2016 players
UEFA Euro 2020 players
Mediterranean Games silver medalists for Turkey
Mediterranean Games medalists in football
Competitors at the 2013 Mediterranean Games
Turkish expatriate footballers
Expatriate footballers in England
Turkish expatriate sportspeople in England